The canton of Saint-Bonnet-le-Château is a French former administrative division located in the department of Loire and the Rhone-Alpes region. It was disbanded following the French canton reorganisation which came into effect in March 2015. It consisted of 11 communes, which joined the canton of Saint-Just-Saint-Rambert in 2015. It had 8,602 inhabitants (2012).

The canton comprised the following communes:

Aboën
Apinac
Estivareilles
Merle-Leignec
Rozier-Côtes-d'Aurec
Saint-Bonnet-le-Château
Saint-Hilaire-Cusson-la-Valmitte
Saint-Maurice-en-Gourgois
Saint-Nizier-de-Fornas
La Tourette
Usson-en-Forez

See also
Cantons of the Loire department

References

Former cantons of Loire (department)
2015 disestablishments in France
States and territories disestablished in 2015